Nick Nuyens (born 5 May 1980) is a Belgian former professional road racing cyclist who last rode for  in the UCI World Tour. His biggest wins included the semi-classics Kuurne–Brussels–Kuurne, Omloop Het Volk, Paris–Brussels and the classic Tour of Flanders.  He was a classics rider. His first wife was the Belgian multiple national champion, Evy Van Damme, with whom he had three children. In 2015 he married Lynn Peeters. He retired in 2015 after failing to secure a new contract.

Career
The year 2011 was a good one for him, since he took the victory on two classics in Flanders. At the end of March, he prevailed in a sprint at the Dwars door Vlaanderen, after desperately trying to steer clear of the group in the last  of the race. Geraint Thomas of  finished second, while the lead group was a few seconds away. Two weeks later, Nuyens took one of the Monuments of cycling, the Tour of Flanders. After the Muur van Geraardsbergen, one of the big favourites, Fabian Cancellara, was caught by the bunch. Nuyens was part of the chasers that bridged to the leading group in the final kilometers, and a trio of riders were left to battle it out for the finish while another group was very close to them in the final meters. Nuyens got the better of Sylvain Chavanel and Cancellara in the three-man sprint. Nuyens said of his biggest win of his career: "It was only in the final 50 meters that I started to fully realize what was happening, that I was about to win this beautiful race."

Nuyens left  at the end of the 2012 season, and joined  on a three-year contract from the 2013 season onwards.

During the 2009 season he used a wood block under his saddle to prevent it from sagging in wet conditions.

Since 2017 Nuyens has been the general manager of the Vérandas Willems–Crelan cycling team, which is a road Pro Continental cycling team and one of the main Belgian cyclo-cross teams.

Career achievements

Major results

2002
 1st  Road race, National Under–23 Road Championships
 1st Ronde Van Vlaanderen Beloften
2003
 1st Nationale Sluitingsprijs
2004
 1st  Overall Ster Elektrotoer
1st Stage 3
 1st Paris–Brussels
 1st Grand Prix de Wallonie
 1st Gran Premio Industria e Commercio di Prato
 3rd Overall Tour of Britain
2005
 1st  Overall Tour of Britain
1st Stages 1 & 5
 1st Omloop Het Volk
 1st Grand Prix de Wallonie
 2nd Overall Ster Elektrotoer
 2nd Druivenkoers Overijse
2006
 1st Kuurne–Brussels–Kuurne
 1st Stage 3 Tour de Suisse
 2nd Grand Prix de Wallonie
 2nd Grand Prix of Aargau Canton
 3rd Brabantse Pijl
 4th Vattenfall Cyclassics
2007
 1st  Overall Étoile de Bessèges
1st Stage 3
 1st Stage 1 Eneco Tour
 2nd Brabantse Pijl
 4th Omloop Het Volk
 7th Tour of Flanders
2008
 2nd Tour of Flanders
 2nd Omloop Het Volk
 9th Road race, UCI Road World Championships
2009
 1st Grand Prix de Wallonie
 8th Amstel Gold Race
2010
 1st Stage 5 Tour of Austria
2011
 1st Tour of Flanders
 1st Dwars door Vlaanderen
 3rd Klasika Primavera

Grand Tour general classification results timeline

References

External links 

Palmares on Cycling Base
Palmares on CQ Ranking

1980 births
Living people
Belgian male cyclists
People from Lier, Belgium
People from Nijlen 
Tour de Suisse stage winners
Cyclists from Antwerp Province